Tao Wu-shiun (born 8 May 1973) is a Taiwanese sprinter. He competed in the men's 200 metres at the 1996 Summer Olympics.

References

1973 births
Living people
Athletes (track and field) at the 1996 Summer Olympics
Taiwanese male sprinters
Olympic athletes of Taiwan
Place of birth missing (living people)
Athletes (track and field) at the 1994 Asian Games
Athletes (track and field) at the 1998 Asian Games
Asian Games competitors for Chinese Taipei